These are lists of schools in the United States.

A-H

Alabama: school districts · high schools
Alaska: school districts · high schools · middle schools
Arizona: by county: school districts · high schools ·  private and independent schools
Arkansas: school districts · high schools
California: school districts  by county: school districts · high schools
Colorado by county: school districts · high schools
Connecticut: school districts · high schools
Delaware by county: school districts · high schools
District of Columbia: public schools · high schools
Florida: school districts · high schools
List of schools in Coral Springs, Florida
Georgia: all schools · school districts · high schools
Hawaii: public schools · high schools
Schools of Hilo, Hawaii
Haynes Academy, Metairie Louisiana

I-M
Idaho: school districts · high schools
Illinois by county: school districts · high schools
Indiana by county: school districts · high schools
Iowa by county: school districts · high schools · private schools
Kansas: school districts · high schools
Kentucky: school districts · high schools · middle schools
Louisiana: school districts · high schools
Maine: school districts · high schools
Maryland: school districts · high schools
List of schools in Montgomery County, Maryland
Massachusetts: school districts · high schools
Michigan: school districts · high schools
Minnesota: school districts · high schools
Mississippi: school districts · high schools · private schools
Missouri: school districts · high schools
Montana by county: high schools

N-P

Nebraska by county: school districts · high schools
Nevada: school districts · high schools
New Jersey by county: school districts · high schools
New Hampshire: school districts · high schools
New Mexico: school districts · high schools
New York: school districts · high schools
List of schools in the Roman Catholic Archdiocese of New York
North Carolina: school districts · high schools · middle schools · elementary schools
List of Raleigh public schools · List of schools in Charlotte, North Carolina
North Dakota by county: school districts · high schools · defunct high schools
Ohio by county: school districts · high schools
Oklahoma: school districts · high schools
List of schools in Tulsa, Oklahoma
Oregon: school districts · high schools
Pennsylvania: school districts · high schools

R-W

Rhode Island: school districts · high schools
South Carolina: school districts · high schools
List of schools in Charleston, South Carolina
South Dakota: school districts · high schools
Tennessee: school districts · high schools
Texas: school districts · high schools
Utah: school districts · high schools
Vermont: school districts · high schools
Virginia: school districts · high schools
Washington: school districts · high schools · private schools
West Virginia: school districts · high schools
Wisconsin: school districts · high schools
Wyoming: school districts · high schools

Insular areas

American Samoa: public schools
Guam: all schools · public schools
Northern Mariana Islands: public schools
Puerto Rico: all schools · high schools · elementary schools
Puerto Rico Department of Education
United States Virgin Islands: St. Thomas-St. John School District · St. Croix School District

See also
List of the oldest public high schools in the United States
List of defunct military academies in the United States
Education in the United States
List of Baptist schools in the United States
List of boarding schools in the United States
List of independent Catholic schools in the United States
List of international schools in the United States
List of Lutheran schools in the United States

External links
 List of US Schools